Jang Yoon-ju (born November 7, 1980) is a South Korean model, television personality, singer-songwriter and actress. Yoon-ju began modeling in 1997 when she was 17 years old, and became one of the most successful Korean fashion models, with a career spanning almost two decades. She also hosts Korea's Next Top Model, and won Best Radio DJ at the 2013 KBS Entertainment Awards for KBS Cool FM's Rooftop Radio. As a singer-songwriter, Jang has released two albums, Dream (2008) and I'm Fine (2012). She made her acting debut in 2015, playing a detective in Ryoo Seung-wan's crime thriller Veteran.

Career
In May 2011, Jang along with fellow models Kim Jae-wook, Ji Hyun-jung, Han Hye-jin and Song Kyung-ah, co-authored a book titled Top Model. It is based on their experiences in the industry and includes beauty, makeup and styling tips.

Filmography

Television

Web shows

Film

Television series

Music videos
 "Good Person" – Toy (2001)
 "Bad Girls" – Lee Hyori (2013)
 "Black Mamba" - Aespa (2020)

Discography
Dream (2008)
I'm Fine (2012)
Lisa (2017)

Radio
 Today Morning (MBC FM4U, 2011) 
 Rooftop Radio (KBS Cool FM, 2012)

Books
CmKm (2005)
Style Book (2006)
Top Model (2011)

Awards and nominations

References

External links

  
  
  

South Korean female models
South Korean television presenters
South Korean women television presenters
South Korean radio presenters
South Korean women radio presenters
Seoul Institute of the Arts alumni
People from Seoul
1980 births
Living people